Donald Voorhees may refer to:

 Donald Voorhees (conductor) (1903–1989), American composer and conductor
 Donald E. Voorhees (born 1930), American politician from Iowa
 Donald S. Voorhees (1916–1989), U.S. federal judge